A list of films produced in Argentina in 2010:

See also
2010 in Argentina

External links
 Argentine films of 2010 at the Internet Movie Database

Films
Argentina
2010